The annual 2015 LKL All-Star Game, was held on March 29, in Vilnius. The format was different from the previous contests: one team – Amžini Priešininkai – consisted of the best players from the two rivaling teams of Žalgiris and Lietuvos rytas, and the other team – LKL Žvaigždės – consisted of the best players from the rest of the LKL teams.

Teams 

** Former Žalgiris and Lietuvos rytas members, Grigorij Khizhnyak and Andrius Šležas, respectively, appeared in the game, as a surprise to the spectators. While a member of Žalgiris, Khizhnyak led the EuroLeague in blocks per game, and otherwise led the team in points and rebounds. Šležas represented Lietuvos rytas for 9 seasons, and was known for his three point shooting abilities. For the "LKL Žvaigždės" team, the two late additions were Mindaugas Žukauskas and Martynas Paliukėnas. Žukauskas, who was a longtime Šiauliai player, established himself as an excellent defender, and a regular Lithuanian national team member. Paliukėnas, is a current member of Dzūkija.

Coaches 
Gintaras Krapikas, of Žalgiris, was chosen as the head coach of Amžini Priešininkai, after collecting 13,152 votes, and ousting his opponent, Marcelo Nicola of Lietuvos rytas, who gathered 6,609 votes. Kazys Maksvytis, of Neptūnas, was chosen as the head coach of LKL Žvaigždės, defeating Dainius Adomaitis, of Juventus, by 7,945 votes to 6,513 votes.

Game

References

External links 
 All–Star Day website

Lietuvos krepšinio lyga All-Star Game
All Star